"Under the Red Lantern of St. Pauli" (in German: "Unter der roten Laterne von St. Pauli") is a German tango song of the 1940s. 

The song was composed by Ralph Maria Siegel and lyrics had written by Günther Schwenn and Peter Schaeffers. Sven-Olof Sandberg  was the first singer to record it on Odeon Records in 1941. 

It refers to the St. Pauli district of Hamburg, the port city's red light district.

In a 1949 review Billboard magazine described it as "a mightily pleasant serenade".

References

German songs
1940s songs
Culture in Hamburg
Songs about cities
Songs about Germany
Songs about prostitutes
Song articles with missing songwriters